Matthew Houlbrook, known professionally as Matt Houlbrook, is a British academic historian who is Professor of Cultural History at the University of Birmingham.

Career 
Houlbrook grew up near the Lincolnshire town of Scunthorpe, and studied history at the University of Cambridge (graduating with a Bachelor of Arts degree) before completing his doctorate (PhD) at the University of Essex in 2002, for a thesis entitled "A sun among cities": space, identities and queer male practices, London 1918–57. He then spent a year as a Junior Research Fellow at New College, Oxford, and then five years at the University of Liverpool. In 2008 he was appointed a Fellow at Magdalen College, Oxford, where he taught history until his move to the University of Birmingham in 2013; as of 2017, he is Professor of Cultural History there.

Research 
Houlbrook's work focuses on the cultural history of modern Britain, with particular reference to sexuality, the city, gender and selfhood. His work has looked at the intersection between urban spaces and sexual identities, as well as the connections between cosmetics, consumer culture, sexuality and the law. His publications include:

Books 
 Queer London: Perils and Pleasures in the Sexual Metropolis, 1918–57 (University of Chicago Press, 2005).
 (edited with H. G. Cocks) Palgrave Advances in the Modern History of Sexuality (Palgrave, 2005).
 (edited with Sarah Newman) The Press and Popular Culture in Interwar Europe (Routledge, 2014).

Journals 
 (with Sarah Newman) "Introduction: The Press and Popular Culture in Interwar Europe", Journalism Studies, vol. 14, issue 5 (2013).
 "Thinking queer: The social and the sexual in Interwar Britain", in Brian Lewis (ed.), British Queer History: New Approaches and Perspectives (Manchester: Manchester University Press, 2013). 
 "Commodifying the self within: ghosts, libels and the crook lifestory in Interwar Britain", Journal of Modern History, vol. 85, issue 2 (2013), pp. 321–63.
 "Fashioning an ex-crook self: citizenship and criminality in the work of Netley Lucas", Twentieth Century British History, vol. 24, issue 1 (2013), pp. 1–30.
 "A pin to see the peep show: culture, fiction and selfhood in the letters of Edith Thompson", Past and Present, vol. 207 (2010), pp. 251–49.
 "Daring to speak whose name? queer cultural politics: 1920–1967", in Marcus Collins (ed.), The Permissive Society and its Enemies (Rivers Oram, 2008).
 "The man with the powder puff in Interwar London", Historical Journal, vol. 50, issue 1 (2007), pp. 145–71.
 (with Chris Waters) "The heart in exile: detachment and desire in 1950s London", History Workshop Journal, vol. 62 (2006).
 "Introduction" and "Cities", in H. G. Cocks and Matt Houlbrook (eds.), Palgrave Advances in the Modern History of Sexuality (Palgrave, 2005).
 "Sexing the history of sexuality", History Workshop Journal, vol. 60, issue 1 (2005), pp. 216–22.
 "Soldier heroes and rent boys: homosex, masculinities and Britishness in the Brigade of Guards: c. 1900–1960", Journal of British Studies, vol. 42, issue 3 (2003), pp. 351–88.
 "'Lady Austin's camp boys': constituting the queer subject in 1930s London", Gender and History, vol. 14, issue 1 (2002), pp. 31–61.
 "Towards a Historical Geography of Sexuality", Journal of Urban History, vol. 2, issue 4 (2001), pp. 497–504.
 "For Whose Convenience? Gay Guides, Cognitive Maps and the Construction of Homosexual London: 1917–1967", in Simon Gunn and R. J. Morris (eds.), Identities in Space: Contested Terrains in the Western City since 1850 (Ashgate, 2001), pp. 165–186.
 "The private world of public urinals: London 1918–1957", London Journal, vol. 25, issue 1 (2000), pp. 52–70.

References 

Alumni of the University of Cambridge
Alumni of the University of Essex
Academics of the University of Oxford
Academics of the University of Liverpool
Academics of the University of Birmingham
British historians
Living people
Year of birth missing (living people)